Professor of Moral Philosophy may refer to:

White's Professor of Moral Philosophy at the University of Oxford
Professor of Moral Philosophy (Glasgow) at the University of Glasgow
Knightbridge Professor of Philosophy at the University of Cambridge
Regius Professor of Moral Philosophy at the University of Aberdeen
Chair of Moral Philosophy (Edinburgh) at the University of Edinburgh